Edin Julardžija (born 21 January 2001) is a Croatian professional footballer who plays as an attacking midfielder for Prva HNL side Gorica.

Club career 
Julardžija was born in the Zagreb neighbourhood of Ferenščica. His father Dino, who hails from Bešpelj near Jajce, Bosnia and Herzegovina, is a coach at Dinamo Zagreb academy, which Edin joined when he was six years old. He started attracting attention of prominent European clubs such as Chelsea (whose offer his family refused in 2014), Milan, Fiorentina, Lazio and Valencia.

Julardžija made his senior debut for Dinamo Zagreb on 17 November 2018, in a friendly against Široki Brijeg. He was a key part of Dinamo's 2019–20 UEFA Youth League campaign, notably scoring a Panenka in a penalty shoot-out in the Round of 16 against Bayern Munich. On 1 April 2020, he signed a professional contract with Dinamo. On 18 July 2020, he made his competitive senior debut in a 0–0 draw with Istra 1961, replacing Lovro Majer in the 85th minute. On 30 November 2020, Julardžija was named amongst twenty best players of the Youth League by UEFA, alongside teammate Bernard Karrica.

In February 2021, Julardžija was loaned out to Slaven Belupo, to replace his Dinamo teammate Niko Janković whose loan deal got terminated by Slaven due to a fifth metatarsal fracture. In July, he was sent on another loan, this time to Šibenik.

He signed a four-year contract with Gorica in summer 2022.

International career 
Eligible to represent Croatia and Bosnia and Herzegovina internationally, Julardžija opted for the former.

Career statistics

Honours 
Dinamo Zagreb
Prva HNL: 2019–20

References

External links 

2001 births
Living people
Footballers from Zagreb
Bosniaks of Croatia
Association football midfielders
Croatian footballers
Croatia youth international footballers
GNK Dinamo Zagreb II players
GNK Dinamo Zagreb players
NK Slaven Belupo players
HNK Šibenik players
HNK Gorica players
First Football League (Croatia) players
Croatian Football League players